is a 2005 Japanese anime television series based on the manga Chibi Vampire written and illustrated by Yuna Kagesaki. Produced by J.C.Staff and directed by Shinichiro Kimura, the series aired on WOWOW from November 4, 2005 through May 12, 2006.

Episode list

References

Karin